Staroarslanbekovo (İśke Arıślanbäk) is a rural locality (a village) in Sayranovsky Selsoviet, Tuymazinsky District, Bashkortostan, Russia. The population was 119 as of 2010. There is 1 street.

Geography 
Staroarslanbekovo is located 52 km southeast of Tuymazy (the district's administrative centre) by road. Novoarslanbekovo is the nearest rural locality.

References 

Rural localities in Tuymazinsky District